, also known as SNMP, is a race complex near Gamagōri, Aichi, Japan.

Course outline
Located on the Nishiura peninsula, SNMP circuit has an excellent view of Mikawa Bay

Located on a narrow site, the course includes eleven corners, a bridge, and some elevation change. The course is also reconfigurable and available for use by motorcycles, cars and karts.

References

External links

Official web site 

Motorsport venues in Japan
Sports venues in Aichi Prefecture
Gamagōri, Aichi
Sports venues completed in 2007
2007 establishments in Japan